was a Japanese football player and manager. He played for Japan national team.

Club career
Miyamoto was born in Hitachi on July 4, 1938. After graduating from Waseda University, he joined Furukawa Electric in 1961. He won 1961 and 1964 Emperor's Cup. In 1965, Furukawa Electric joined new league Japan Soccer League. He retired in 1974. He played 103 games and scored 19 goals in the league. He was selected Best Eleven in 1966, 1967 and 1968.

National team career
On December 25, 1958, when Miyamoto was a Waseda University student, he debuted for Japan national team against Hong Kong. He was selected Japan for 1964 Summer Olympics in Tokyo and 1968 Summer Olympics in Mexico City. Although he did not play at 1964 Summer Olympics, he played 5 games at 1968 Summer Olympics and Japan won bronze medal. In 2018, this team was selected Japan Football Hall of Fame. He also played at 1962 and 1966 Asian Games. He played 44 games and scored 1 goal for Japan until 1971.

Coaching career
After retirement, Miyamoto became a manager for Honda in 1983 and managed until 1989. In January 1989, he also managed for Japan national futsal team for 1989 Futsal World Championship in Netherlands. In 1992, he signed with Kashima Antlers joined new league J1 League. In 1993, he led the club to won 2nd place at J1 League and 1993. he resigned in June 1994. He also managed Shimizu S-Pulse in 1995.

On May 7, 2002, he died of pneumonia in Mito at the age of 63. In 2005, he was selected Japan Football Hall of Fame.

Club statistics

National team statistics

Managerial statistics

Honors and awards

Individual honors
 Japan Soccer League Best Eleven: (3) 1966, 1967, 1968

Team honors
 Emperor's Cup: 1961, 1964

References

External links

 
 Japan National Football Team Database

Japan Football Hall of Fame at Japan Football Association
Japan Football Hall of Fame (Japan team at 1968 Olympics) at Japan Football Association

1938 births
2002 deaths
Waseda University alumni
Association football people from Ibaraki Prefecture
Japanese footballers
Japan international footballers
Japan Soccer League players
JEF United Chiba players
Olympic footballers of Japan
Olympic medalists in football
Olympic bronze medalists for Japan
Medalists at the 1968 Summer Olympics
Footballers at the 1964 Summer Olympics
Footballers at the 1968 Summer Olympics
Asian Games medalists in football
Asian Games bronze medalists for Japan
Footballers at the 1962 Asian Games
Footballers at the 1966 Asian Games
Japanese football managers
J1 League managers
Kashima Antlers managers
Shimizu S-Pulse managers
Association football defenders
Deaths from pneumonia in Japan
Medalists at the 1966 Asian Games